QS may refer to:

Business
QS mark (for "quality and safety"), on Chinese products
Quacquarelli Symonds, an education and careers networking company
QS World University Rankings, an annual publication
Quality System (QS) Regulation, a business process
Quantity surveyor, a professional in the construction industry concerned with costs and contracts
Travel Service (IATA airline designator QS)
Quadraphonic sound, the Sansui QS Regular Matrix system

Politics
Québec solidaire, a political party in Quebec, Canada
Quis separabit?, an Irish Loyalist motto

Science, technology, and mathematics

Health and medicine
ATCvet code QS Sensory organs, a section of the Anatomical Therapeutic Chemical Classification System for veterinary medicinal products
Quantum satis, a Latin term meaning "the amount which is needed", used in food and drug regulation
Quinolinate synthase, an enzyme

Mathematics
Quadratic sieve, an integer factorization algorithm
Quicksort, a sorting algorithm

Other uses in science and technology
Quadraphonic sound, or "Quadphonic Synthesizer", a matrix quadraphonic gramophone record format developed by Sansui
Quality Score, a variable used by search engines to set the rank and cost of ads
Quantified self, a movement to incorporate technology into data acquisition on aspects of a person's daily life
Quicksand, a colloid hydrogel consisting of fine granular material and water
Quorum sensing, a system of interaction in natural and synthetic populations

Sport
Quality start, a baseball statistic calculated for starting pitchers
Qualcomm Stadium, a stadium in San Diego, California

Other uses
Queen's Scout, a scout who has attained the Queen's Scout Award
Queen's Serjeant, an obsolete legal position in the United Kingdom